Jeremy Turner (born June 18, 1975 in Sewickley, Pennsylvania) is an American composer and multi-instrumentalist living in California.

Biography
Jeremy Turner began playing the piano and the cello as a young child. After his family moved to Michigan where his father was Director of Admissions at Michigan State University, Turner attended East Lansing High School. He then furthered his musical studies at The Juilliard School as a pupil of Harvey Shapiro. In 1997, before graduating Juilliard, Turner joined The Metropolitan Opera Orchestra at just 21 years old, becoming one of the youngest members ever to join the ensemble. At the end of his first season Turner was invited to join the Met Chamber Ensemble in its inaugural year. In 2005 he took a leave of absence from the Met to be the interim Principal Cellist of The Auckland Philharmonia Orchestra in New Zealand. After returning to the Met in 2006, Turner played his final season in 2011 before leaving the orchestra to pursue composition.

Composer/performer
Turner has recorded with musicians such as Paul McCartney, David Byrne, Sufjan Stevens, and The National, has performed with various artists that include Renee Fleming, Joshua Bell, and Arcade Fire and as a conductor has appeared twice at the LACMA Art + Film Gala. In 2013, he collaborated on original music with James Murphy for the Broadway revival of Harold Pinter's Betrayal, directed by Mike Nichols. As a composer, Turner has been nominated for two Emmy Awards, won the Music & Sound Award (UK), won the International Documentary Association award for best music, was a 2015 Sundance fellow, and was named in NPR Music's Favorite Songs of 2014. He received the AICP Award for best original music for his score to Google's first ever television commercial, "Parisian Love", which debuted during the broadcast of Super Bowl XLIV . He has performed on Saturday Night Live with My Morning Jacket, the Late Show With David Letterman with Dirty Projectors, and performed with Renee Fleming at the opening of Carnegie Hall's Zankel Hall. In 2015 he composed music for Chris Doyle's exhibition "Night Lights at Wave Hill", featuring the Brooklyn Youth Chorus. Turner was a member of Low City, a musical duo based in Brooklyn. In 2014 he appeared with Simon Spurr in the September issue of Vanity Fair

Selected film and television scores
A Spark Story (2021)
WeWork: Or The Making and Breaking of a $47 Billion Unicorn (2021)
Marvel's 616 (2020)
Chef's Table (2020)
Immigration Nation (2020)
Killer Inside: The Mind of Aaron Hernandez (2020)
Ode To Joy (2019)
Come As You Are (2019)
Strokes Of Genius (2018)
Family (2018)
Five Came Back (TV series) (2017)
Trophy (2017)
Americana (2016)
ESPN 30 for 30: First Pitch (2015)
This Time Next Year (2014)
Black Gold by PES (2014)
Narco Cultura (2013)
A Birder's Guide to Everything (2013)

Main titles/themes
Marvel's 616 (2020)
Immigration Nation (2020)
 Strokes of Genius (2018)
 A Year in Space (2015)
Independent Lens (2014–)

Concert works
Shorebirds (2022) written for solo violin
Six Mile House (2021) written for piano, clarinet, violin, and cello
Suite of Unreason (2017) written for clarinet, cello, piano and percussion
Swell (2017) written for The Flux Quartet
The Inland Seas (2016) written for James Ehnes and Chris Thile
The Lightening (2015) written for the Brooklyn Youth Chorus
The Fluid (2014) written for woodwind ensemble, cello, and piano
The Bear and the Squirrel (2014) written for yMusic

Selected album appearances
S. Carey - 100 Acres (2018 Jagjaguwar)
LCD Soundsystem - Christmas Will Break Your Heart (2015 DFA Records)
GIVERS - New Kingdom (2015 Glassnote Records)
yMusic– Balance Problems (2014 New Amsterdam Records)
Museum of Love – Museum of Love (2014 DFA Records)
Gabriel Kahane – The Ambassador (2014 Sony Masterworks)
The National – Trouble Will Find Me (2013 4AD)
Citizen Cope – One Lovely Day (2012 Rainbow Recordings)
Teddy Thompson – Bella (2011 Verve Forecast Records)
Hercules and Love Affair – Blue Songs (2011 Moshi Moshi Records)
Sufjan Stevens – The Age of Adz (2010 Asthmatic Kitty)
Free Energy – Stuck on Nothing (2010 DFA Records)
Akron/Family – Akron/Family (2005 Young God Records)
David Byrne – Grown Backwards (2004 Nonesuch Records)
Joss Stone – The Soul Sessions (2003 S-Curve Records)
Mariah Carey – Charmbracelet (2002 Island Records)

References

External links
 IMDB, Turner's film credits
 Turner's official website, where his music can be heard
 Turner's publishing company, where his music can be licensed

1975 births
Living people
American multi-instrumentalists
Musicians from Pennsylvania